Zabta Khan Shinwari (born 3 March 1959) is a Pakistani botanist and researcher.

Early life and education 
Zabta Khan Shinwari was born on 3 March 1959 in Kohat, Khyber Pakhtunkhwa, Pakistan.
Shinwari got his B.Sc (Biology) degree in 1980 and M.Sc (Botany) in 1983 from University of Peshawar, M. Phil. (Taxonomy) in 1986 from Quaid-i-Azam University Islamabad, Ph.D. (Molecular Systematics) in 1994 Kyoto University (Japan) and Post Doc Fellow in 1996-98 from International Research Center for Agricultural Sciences (JIRCAS) Japan.

In 2008, he was elected a Fellow of the Pakistan Academy of Sciences.

In 2016, he was elected a Fellow of the Islamic World Academy of Sciences.

Awards 
 UNESCO Avicenna Prize for ethics in science (2015)
 Tamgha-e-Imtiaz (Medal of Distinction) Award by the Government of Pakistan (2011)
 Sitara-i-Imtiaz (Star of Distinction) Award by the President of Pakistan (2018)
 Distinguished Scientists Award by Chinese Academy of Sciences (2019 - 2020)
 Best University Teacher Award by the Higher Education Commission of Pakistan (2012)

References 

1959 births
Living people
University of Peshawar alumni
Pakistani academic administrators
Pakistani botanists
Recipients of Tamgha-e-Imtiaz
Recipients of Sitara-i-Imtiaz
Vice-Chancellors of universities in Pakistan
Quaid-i-Azam University alumni
Kyoto University alumni
People from Kohat District
Recipients of Avicenna Prize
Fellows of Pakistan Academy of Sciences
Academic staff of Quaid-i-Azam University
Fellows of the Islamic World Academy of Sciences